A militant siege of Entrepreneurship Development Institute in Pulwama district occurred on 20 February 2016 in Kashmir. It was part of the 2016 Kashmir unrest.

Events
Prior to this incident militants had attacked a Central Reserve Police convoy travelling on the Srinagar Jammu National Highway, resulting in three police deaths. In a gunfight later, one civilian was killed in gunfire between police and militants, and over a dozen were injured, including police.

After the attack on convoy, militants besieged the Entrepreneurship Development Institute of India. The government personnel were immediately rescued but one employee, a gardener, was killed in the initial gunfight. The fight lasted 48 hours, in which, it was found, three militants were cleverly changing their position in the building, engaging security forces in fierce battle. A special team of Indian forces finally cleared each floor of the building and searched every room for militants, then neutralized all three.

References

February 2016 crimes in Asia
2010s in Jammu and Kashmir
Mass murder in 2016
Pulwama district
Terrorist incidents in India in 2016
2016 murders in India
Pulwama